The Sword of Islam was a ceremonial weapon given in 1937 to Benito Mussolini, who was pronounced as the Protector of Islam.

History

In 1934, after the creation of Italian Libya, Mussolini adopted a policy for encouraging comparisons with Islam, calling the local population "Italian Muslims of the fourth shore of Italy", building or restoring mosques and Quranic schools, preparing service facilities for the pilgrims going to Mecca and even making a High School of Islamic Culture in Tripoli. Behind the apparent humanitarian intent, the Fascists and some sectors of the Islamic world were recognizing that Mussolini's policy targeted the common enemies of Fascist Italy and Islam, France and the United Kingdom. These common interests were generated from the aversion to the agreements of the Treaty of Versailles of 1919, dominated by France, the United Kingdom and the United States which had neither fully satisfied the requests brought forth by Italy, nor the requests from this part of the Islamic world.

In order to earn the favour of the Arabs and to seal himself the alliance, Mussolini, although a signatory of the Lateran Treaty with the Holy See, decided to have bestowed on him the title of Protector of Islam. According to the interpretation of Mussolini, with the Italian government taking over the place of the Ottomans in Libya, such a title was up to him concerning law since, in some manner, he was heir of the authority of the caliph. On 20 March 1937, in the outskirts of Tripoli, Mussolini received the Sword of Islam from Iusuf Kerisc, a leading Berber supporter of the Italian occupation against the Libyan resistance, during a lavish ceremony. After entering Tripoli among salutes of cannons and at the head of a rank of 2,600 cavalrymen, Mussolini reaffirmed his closeness to the Muslim population, guaranteeing "peace, justice, wellness and respect for the laws of the Prophet."

In spite of the approval from the media of the regime, the ceremony provoked hilarity among the Italian people because of its absurd and paradoxical connotations. One of the photographs of the event, depicting Mussolini on the saddle of a horse held by the halter by a groom, in his official version was retouched and published deleting the groom, in order to make it appear that Mussolini was able to ride his own mount without anyone's help. The detail is often cited as one of the more typical examples of the art of falsification established in the totalitarian regime.

The following year, a horse monument was inaugurated in the main square of the Libyan capital in honour of Mussolini. Its base read: "To Benito Mussolini, peacemaker of the people, redeemer of the land of Libya, the mindful population and exhibitions where the Sword of Islam flashed consecrate in the sign of the Lictor a loyalty that challenges the destiny."

The sword, decorated in arabesque, equipped with a double-edged straight blade and with a hilt and solid gold friezes, had been achieved from the art firm Picchiani e Barlacchi di Firenze on the order of Mussolini himself. After 1937, it was no longer used and was guarded in a small glass reliquary at Rocca delle Caminate, summer residence of Mussolini. There were no more signs of the precious object after 25 July 1943, when Rocca delle Caminate was ravaged and plundered by the Italian resistance.

Notes

Bibliography 
 
 
 
 
 
 

Benito Mussolini
History of Islam
Lost works of art
Swords
1937 in Libya
Fascism in the Arab world
1930s in Islam
Individual weapons